Kontra Bandido is a 1986 Filipino action comedy film co-written and directed by J. Erastheo Navoa and starring Ramon Zamora, Rey Malonzo, Paquito Diaz, Bernardo Bernardo, Janice Jurado, Lito Pastrana, Max Alvarado, Arlene Muhlach, and Niño Muhlach. Produced by Autorama Films, it was released by Wonder Films on December 11, 1986.

Critic Jojo Legaspi of the National Midweek gave the film a positive review for its effective combination of the action and comedy genres.

Cast
Niño Muhlach
Ramon Zamora
Rey Malonzo
Paquito Diaz
Bernardo Bernardo
Janice Jurado
Lito Pastrana
Max Alvarado
Arlene Muhlach
Sabatini Fernandez
Franco Mateo
Jack Jacutin
Jimmy Reyes
Ernie David
Buddy Dator
George Wendth
Abel Morado
Rey Tomenes
Waldo Reyes
Rod Francisco
Joe Estrada
Bebot David
Tom Alvarez
Eddie Villa
Jeanbel Navoa
Luis Benedicto

Release
Kontra Bandido was released in theaters on December 11, 1986.

Critical response
Jojo Legaspi, writing for the National Midweek, gave Kontra Bandido a positive review, commending the film's fairly effective combination of the action and comedy genres which he stated was "because of several effective departures from local convention." Legaspi also wrote that the film did well in providing a good ensemble support to Niño Muhlach, whose popularity was declining due to him slowly outgrowing his child actor status.

References

External links

1986 films
1980s action comedy films
1986 action films
1986 comedy films
Filipino-language films
Films shot in Rizal
Philippine action comedy films